Huang Mei (born 15 January 1975) is a Chinese sprinter who specialized in the 200 metres.

Her personal best time is 23.04 seconds, achieved in July 2001 in Chengdu.

Achievements

References

1975 births
Living people
Chinese female sprinters
Asian Games medalists in athletics (track and field)
Athletes (track and field) at the 2002 Asian Games
Asian Games gold medalists for China
Medalists at the 2002 Asian Games
Runners from Guangxi
21st-century Chinese women